Sternocera orissa, common name  Giant jewel beetle, is a species of beetles belonging to the Buprestidae family.

Subspecies
 Sternocera orissa abita Holm & Gussmann, 1992 
 Sternocera orissa bertolonii Thomson, 1878 
 Sternocera orissa lanifica Erichson, 1843 
 Sternocera orissa luctifera Klug, 1855 
 Sternocera orissa orissa Buquet, 1837 
 Sternocera orissa variabilis Kerrmans, 1886

Description
The basic color of the elytra is greenish-black or bluish-black, with whitish to yellowish eyespots and markings.

Distribution
This species can be found in Botswana, southern Malawi, Namibia, South Africa, Zambia, Mozambique, Zimbabwe and in Tanzania.

References

External links
 Flickr

Buprestidae
Beetles described in 1837
Beetles of Africa